Mostovsky District is an administrative district (raion), one of the thirty-eight in Krasnodar Krai, Russia. As a municipal division, it is incorporated as Mostovsky Municipal District. It is located in the southeast of the krai. Its administrative center is the urban locality (an urban-type settlement) of Mostovskoy. Population:  The population of Mostovskoy accounts for 35.2% of the district's total population.

References

Notes

Sources

Districts of Krasnodar Krai